Elections were held in Jersey on 30 August 1940. The island was occupied by the Germans from 1 July 1940 until the surrender of the German forces on 9 May 1945. During this time, there was one election, held soon after the occupation began. The result installed puppet leader Edward Campbell as a front for the German administration, which was centered around the department of Manche, a French department in Normandy. Also standing was Thomas Jenkins.

The election was unique in that only two candidates stood to represent the entire island. The post voted for was short-lived, and the Nazis removed it in 1942 to little reaction from the islanders. Campbell returned to his suffering business. He later went broke and died before the end of the war.

Candidates 
Edward Campbell was a businessman in his mid fifties, and considerably more experienced than his opponent, a fact which he exploited to win over 70% of the vote
Thomas Jenkins was a politician from Jersey, after losing he escaped the island and joined the army in England, and fought the Axis powers in North Africa. He received 30% of the vote.

References

1940
German occupation of Jersey during World War II
1940 elections in Europe
1940 in Jersey